Merrell may refer to:

 Merrell (company), an American footwear maker
 Merrell Tavern, a historic tavern in South Lee, Massachusetts, USA
 Merrell Dow Pharmaceuticals, former U.S. pharmaceutical company

People
 Barry Merrell (b. 1945), Canadian professional ice hockey player
 Billy Merrell (b. 1982), American author and poet
 James Merrell (b. 1953), American historian and college professor
 John Porter Merrell (1846–1916), American admiral
 Joseph F. Merrell (1926–1945), American soldier and Medal of Honor recipient
 Merrell Fankhauser (b. 1943), American singer, songwriter, and guitarist
 Merrell Jackson (1952–1991), American actor
 Veronica & Vanessa Merrell (b. 1996), identical twin American YouTubers, actresses, musicians and singers

See also
 Merel, name